Kings XI Punjab (KXIP) is a franchise cricket team based in Mohali, India, which plays in the Indian Premier League (IPL). They were one of the nine teams that competed in the 2013 Indian Premier League. They were captained by David Hussey. Kings XI Punjab finished 6th in the IPL and did not qualify for the Champions League T20.

Indian Premier League

Season standings
Kings XI Punjab finished 6th in the league stage of IPL 2013.

Match log

References

2013 Indian Premier League
Punjab Kings seasons